Dudo (Spanish for I doubt), also known as Cacho, Pico, Perudo, Liar's Dice, Cachito or Dadinho is a popular dice game played in South America. It is a more specific version of a family of games collectively called Liar's Dice, which has many forms and variants. This game can be played by two or more players and consists of guessing how many dice, placed under cups, there are on the table showing a certain number. The player who loses a round loses one of their dice. The last player to still have dice is the winner.

Game play

Each player starts having five dice and a cup, which is used for shaking the dice and concealing the dice from the other players. Players roll a die in order, to determine where and in what order they sit. Highest first, then next lowest and so on. In the event of a tie between 2 players, they simply re-roll until one gains a higher score.

After deciding who starts the game (this can be done by making each player roll one die, for example), the players shake their dice in their cups, and then each player looks at their own dice, keeping their dice concealed from other players. Then, the first player makes a bid about how many dice of a certain value are showing among all players, at a minimum. Aces (dice showing a one) are wild, meaning that they count as every number. For example, a bid of "five threes" is a claim that between all players, there are at least five dice showing a three or an ace. The player challenges the next player (moving clockwise) to raise the bid or call dudo to end the round.

Raise also known as "bid" in most versions, a player can increase the quantity of dice (e.g. from "five threes" to "six threes") or the die number (e.g. "five threes" to "five sixes") or both. If a player increases the quantity, they can choose any number e.g. a bid may increase from "five threes" to "six twos".
Bidding aces a player who wishes to bid aces can halve the quantity of dice, rounding upwards. For instance, if the current bid is "five threes" then the next player would have to bid at least three aces. If the current bid is aces, the next player can call dudo or increase the quantity (e.g. "four aces") or bid a different number, in which case the lower bound on the quantity is one more than double the previous quantity—for instance, from "three aces", a player wishing to bid fours would have to bid "seven fours" or higher.
Call also known as dudo, if the player calls, it means that they do not believe the previous bid was correct. All dice are then shown and, if the guess is not correct, the previous player (the player who made the bid) loses a die. If it is correct, the player who called loses a die. A player with no dice remaining is eliminated from the game. After calling, a new round starts with the player that lost a die making the first bid, or (if that player was eliminated) the player to that player's left.
Spot on also known as "calza" in some versions, the player claims that the previous bidder's bid is exactly right. If the number is higher or lower, the claimant loses the round; otherwise, the bidder loses the round. A "spot-on" claim typically has a lower chance of being correct than a challenge, so a correct "spot on" call sometimes has a greater reward, such as the player regaining a previously lost die.

When a player first reaches one dice (i.e. loses a round and goes from two dice to one), a Palifico round is played. During this round, the player makes an opening bid and their choice of die number cannot be changed. Aces are not wild during the round. For instance, the player who is down to one die may bid "two fours", and the next player's only options are to raise the quantity (to "three fours" or higher), or to call.

The game ends when only one player has dice remaining; that player is the winner.

Rule Variants 
Dice Loss Penalty 

"Dead man’s Kalzah"
Australian variant - for players that have ended the game early - Dead man's Kalzah can be called once per game, after that player has lost all 5 dice in total, returns with only 2 dice.

"Veteran Palafico"
Australian variant proposed bill - player on Palafico, next opponent can over-ride palafico if they have already survive a previous palafico round. This is being challenged by Lord Rockman. Meaning that 6 ones is not more powerful than one one. One should be more powerful than 7

Players lose as many dice as the difference between the challenged bid and the actual number of dice. This risk of having a wrong prediction is greater.

If a player inadvertently moves (i.e. shakes their cup, a die falls off the table, etc) any of the their dice, then the round is declared over and it is replayed. This is known as the "Pettijohn rule".

Online Adaptations 
 Dudo.ai
 LeFun.fun
 BoardGameArena.com

References 

Dice games